L'Avenir ("Future" in French) may refer to:

 L'Avenir, Quebec, municipality located in the Centre-du-Québec region of Quebec
 L'Avenir Ensemble, a political party in New Caledonia
 L'Avenir (Belgian newspaper), a French-language newspaper published in Namur, Belgium
 L'Avenir (Congolese newspaper), a French-language newspaper published in Kinshasa, the Democratic Republic of the Congo
 L'Avenir (Tonkin), magazine published in Tonkin, Vietnam
 L'Avenir (film), a French film

See also
 Avenir (disambiguation)